Sashikumar Subramony, better known as Sashi Kumar, is an Indian actor who has worked in Tamil language films, stage and serials. He made a breakthrough as an actor with his performances in Mani Ratnam's Kannathil Muthamittal (2002) and Balu Mahendra's Thalaimuraigal (2013), playing the lead role in the later.
 Currently Creative Producer for PD Studios Kakkai Siraginiley

Career
Sashikumar was born in Coimbatore, Tamil Nadu to a Keralan-born Tamil Iyer and a Nambudiri mother. He became interested in acting from a young age, first appearing as Joseph in a nativity play, and completed his studies at Stanes Anglo Indian Higher Secondary School before doing a degree in Mechanical Engineering. He then attempted to become an actor and sought opportunities by visiting directors' houses including Balu Mahendra's, where the director asked him to get out after a meeting lasting a few seconds. Unable to get acting role, he instead worked as an editor at JJ TV for a year, until the channel ceased production in 1996. Sashi Kumar became acquainted with cinematographer Sakthi Saravanan and director Raja Pandi and through them began portraying small roles in Tamil television serials. In 1999, Sashikumar was spotted by Balu Mahendra, who had forgotten their earlier meeting and wanted to cast him in an episode for the serial, Kadhai Neram. When, Sashi turned up at the shoot, Balu Mahendra felt that the actor was unsuitable for the character and asked him to leave the set. Sashi Kumar improvised, re-did his appearance and pleaded with Balu Mahendra to give him the role, to which the director obliged. Impressed by his performance, Sashi Kumar went on to work over thirty more times with Balu Mahendra for episodes of Kadhai Neram, including for the serial's Hindi version. He continued working on Tamil serials including Raadhika's Chithi, becoming acquainted with several other film-makers during the period.

Sashikumar worked on the pre-production of a feature film with Balu Mahendra during 2000 but the pair were unable to find a producer, so Sashikumar began acting in Tamil films as a supporting actor. He first appeared as Rambha's brother in N. Linguswamy's Aanandham (2001), before playing the character of a mentally-retarded youngster in Shahjahan (2001). Balu Mahendra then recommended Sashikumar to director Mani Ratnam during a chance meeting at Vijay Adhiraj's wedding, and the film-maker chose him to portray a LTTE separatist in the war drama, Kannathil Muthamittal (2002). He continued to portray small roles in films including in Balu Mahendra's Julie Ganapathi (2003), Nala Damayanthi (2003) and Thalainagaram. Following the release of the S. J. Surya-starrer Newtonin Moondram Vidhi (2009), Sashikumar struggled to gain film offers and considered leaving back to his home town.

Sashikumar returned to star in Sri Ramakrishna Darshanam (2012) starring as Indian yogi Ramakrishna for the venture. In 2013, he was cast in the lead role in Balu Mahendra's final film, Thalaimuraigal, portraying an estranged son of the character portrayed by the director. Produced by director Sasikumar, the film opened to positive reviews in December 2013 but did not garner publicity to perform well at the box office. The Hindu called the film "good cinema" and added Sashikumar's "appreciable underplay is his asset" and "sadly, cinema has not used him enough". Rediff.com called the film "brilliant" and Behindwoods.com labelled the film as "an artistic piece of parallel cinema". Balu Mahendra died two months after the film's release.

Filmography

References

External links

Living people
Male actors in Tamil cinema
21st-century Indian male actors
Male actors from Tamil Nadu
People from Coimbatore
Place of birth missing (living people)
1974 births